Gymnopilus noviholocirrhus is a species of mushroom in the family Hymenogastraceae. This species is known only from one locality, on the island of Hahajima, growing on the species Celtis boninensis. It is thought to be extinct.

See also

 List of Gymnopilus species

References

External links
Gymnopilus noviholocirrhus at Index Fungorum

noviholocirrhus
Fungi of North America